Male Pijace (in Serbian Cyrillic: Мале Пијаце, in Hungarian: Kispiac) is a village in Serbia. It is situated in the Kanjiža municipality, in the North Banat District, Vojvodina province. The village has a Hungarian ethnic majority (96.37%) and its population numbering 1,988 people (2002 census).

See also
List of places in Serbia
List of cities, towns and villages in Vojvodina

External links
 History of Male Pijace 

Places in Bačka